Small Steps is a 2006 novel for young adults by Louis Sachar, first published by Delacorte Books (Dell). It is a spinoff and the sequel to Holes, focusing on Theodore "Armpit" Johnson, a secondary character from Holes. Stanley Yelnats, the main character of Holes, is only briefly and indirectly mentioned.

Plot

Three years after his release from Camp Green Lake, Theodore “Armpit” Johnson is living in Austin, Texas trying to build a stable lifestyle by working for a landscaping company and caring for his neighbor Ginny McDonald, a ten-year-old girl with cerebral palsy. He meets Rex "X-Ray" Washburn, a friend from Camp Green Lake, who asks for his help in a ticket scalping scheme for teen pop star Kaira DeLeon's upcoming concert. Armpit tries to use two tickets to impress a crush, who cannot go; instead, he takes Ginny. When they present the tickets, they turn out to be counterfeit, and Armpit is beaten and handcuffed by police officers. Ginny has a seizure, which the officers misinterpret as a reaction to drugs. When singer Kaira finds out, she invites them backstage, and she later forms a friendship with Armpit.

An X-ray later reveals that he sold the original tickets and the ones he gave Armpit were photocopies; he returns the profit to Armpit. Later, Armpit is questioned by Detective Debbie Newberg of the Austin Police Department, and he invents a fake suspect to avoid getting accused of ticket scalping. 

Kaira invites Armpit to San Francisco, but before he goes, he is attacked by members of the scalping ring. They threaten to expose Armpit unless he gives them a letter from Kaira. Armpit meets Kaira in San Francisco and asks her for a new letter to sell, but she feels like he's using her, and they have an argument. Later Kaira's manager and stepfather, Jerome "El Genius" Paisley, attacks Kaira with a metal bat as part of a plan to steal her money. The attack continues until Armpit and Kaira's bodyguard intervenes. After Kaira is safe and Armpit has returned to Texas, he is interviewed again by Detective Newberg, who admits she figured out about the scalping ring but will not be pressing charges. Jerome goes to jail, and Kaira discovers her mother's best friend has stolen her savings. She decides to continue making music to recoup some of her finances.

The story ends when Armpit hears Kaira sing a song she wrote about him on the radio and accepts that his life cannot revolve around her; instead, he decides to continue with his plan of taking small steps toward making a better life for himself.

Reception

In a review for Holes, Josh Lacey commented Small Steps "has a lot to recommend - funny things, a fast-moving story, some emotive scenes, an interesting central character - but does inevitably suffer by comparison with Sachar's last novel." During his review for the New York Times, A.O. Scott praised the novel's prose as being "clear and relaxed, and funny in a low-key, observant way," and observed that unlike Holes, in Small Steps "the realism is more conventional, and the book sticks more closely to the genre of young-adult problem literature."

Publishing history
Sachar, Louis. Small Steps. New York: Delacorte, 2006. Print.
Sachar, Louis. Small Steps, Holes Series, New York: Delacorte, 2006. Press.

References

2006 American novels
Novels by Louis Sachar
Sequel novels
American young adult novels
Novels set in Austin, Texas
Novels set in San Francisco
Delacorte Press books
Bloomsbury Publishing books
Doubleday Canada books